Philippa of Hainault (sometimes spelled Hainaut; Middle French: Philippe de Hainaut; 24 June 1310 (or 1315) – 15 August 1369) was Queen of England as the wife and political adviser of King Edward III. She acted as regent in 1346, when her husband was away for the Hundred Years' War.

Daughter of Count William of Hainaut and French princess Joan of Valois, Philippa was engaged to Edward, Prince of Wales, in 1326. Their marriage was celebrated in York Minster on 24 January 1328, some months after Edward's accession to the throne of England and Isabella of France's infamous invasion. After her husband reclaimed the throne, Philippa influenced King Edward to take interest in the nation's commercial expansion, was part of the successful Battle of Neville's Cross, and often went on expeditions to Scotland and France. She won much popularity with the English people for her compassion in 1347, when she successfully persuaded the King to spare the lives of the Burghers of Calais. This popularity helped maintain peace in England throughout their long reign.

Childhood

Philippa was born on 24 June c.1310/15, in Valenciennes, Low Countries. She was one of eight children and the second of five daughters born from William I, Count of Hainaut, and Joan of Valois, granddaughter of King Philip III of France. The Royal House of Valois was a cadet branch of the Capetian Dynasty, also known as the House of France.

King Edward II decided that an alliance with Flanders would benefit England and sent Bishop Stapledon of Exeter on the Continent as an ambassador. On his journey, he crossed into the county of Hainaut to inspect the daughters of Count William of Hainaut, to determine which daughter would be the most suitable as an eventual bride for young Prince Edward. The bishop's report to the King describes one of the Count's daughters in detail. A later annotation says it describes Philippa as a child, but historian Ian Mortimer argues that it is actually an account of her older sister Margaret. The description runs:

Growing up in the Low Countries in the period when this region was growing into a major trading centre, Philippa was well versed in finances and diplomacy. Her older sister Margaret succeeded their brother William II, Count of Hainaut, upon his death in battle. The counties of Holland, Zeeland and the seigniory of Frisia were devolved to Margaret after agreement between the sisters.

Four years later, in the summer of 1326, Isabella of France, the Queen of England, arrived at the court of Hainaut to seek aid from Count William in order to depose her husband, Edward II, from the throne. Prince Edward had accompanied his mother to Hainaut, where she arranged the betrothal to 13-year-old Philippa in exchange for assistance. As the couple were second cousins (as great-grandchildren of Philip III of France), a Papal dispensation was required; and sent from Pope John XXII at Avignon in September 1327. Philippa's retinue arrived in England in December, escorted by her uncle John of Hainaut. On 23 December, she reached London where a "rousing reception was accorded her".

Queen of England

First years
In October 1327, Philippa married Edward by proxy through the Bishop of Coventry in Valenciennes. The official marriage was at York Minster on 24 January 1328, eleven months after Edward's accession to the English throne; although the de facto rulers were Queen Mother Isabella and her avaricious lover, Roger Mortimer, 1st Earl of March, who jointly acted as his regents. Soon after their marriage, the couple retired to live at Woodstock Palace in Oxfordshire. Unlike many of her predecessors, Philippa did not alienate the English people by retaining her foreign retinue or bringing large numbers of foreigners to the English court. In August, her dower was fixed. She became a patron of the chronicler Jean Froissart and owned several illuminated manuscripts, one of which currently is housed in the national library in Paris.  Froissart began to describe her as "The most gentle Queen, most liberal, and most courteous that ever was Queen in her days."

As Isabella did not wish to relinquish her own status, Philippa's coronation was postponed for two years. She was crowned queen on 18 February 1330 at Westminster Abbey, when she was almost five months pregnant. She gave birth to her first son, Edward, the following June. In October 1330, King Edward commenced his personal rule by staging a coup and ordering the arrest of the regents. Shortly afterward, Mortimer was executed for treason and then the Queen Mother was sent to Castle Rising in Norfolk, where she spent a number of years under house arrest but with her privileges and freedom of movement eventually restored.

She was invested as a Lady of the Order of the Garter (LG) in 1358.

Political influence
Philippa proved to be the model of a queen and worked tirelessly for the crown, maintaining balance between royal and familial duties admired in tumultuous times. She was widely loved and respected as a queen who managed to have a successful marriage with Edward.

As the financial demands of the recent Hundred Years' War were enormous, Philippa wisely advised the King to take interest in the nation's commercial expansion as a different method of covering the expenses. She established the textile industry in Norwich by encouraging Flemish weavers to settle there and promoted coal mining in Tynedale.

She was appointed to serve as regent in 1346, while her husband was away for the Hundred Years' War.

In 1364 or 1365, Edward III demanded the return of Hainaut and other inheritances which had been given over to the dukes of Bavaria–Straubing in the name of Philippa, but he was unsuccessful as the custom in those regions favoured male heirs.

Military campaigns
Philippa served as regent of England during the absence of her spouse in 1346. Facing a Scottish invasion, she gathered the English army, fought the Scots at the Battle of Neville's Cross near Durham, and rallied the English soldiers on horse before them prior to the battle. This event resulted in an English victory and the Scottish King David II being taken prisoner, and held captive for eleven years.

Philippa accompanied her husband on expeditions to Scotland and the rest of Europe in the early campaigns of the Hundred Years War, where she won acclaim for her gentle nature and compassion.  She was also remembered for persuading her husband to spare the lives of the Burghers of Calais, whom he had planned to execute as an example to the townspeople following his successful siege of that port.

Death

On 15 August 1369, Queen Philippa died of an illness similar to edema in Windsor Castle. She was given a state funeral six months later on 9 January 1370 and was interred at Westminster Abbey. Her alabaster effigy was executed by sculptor Jean de Liège. Her tomb was placed on the northeast side of the Chapel of Edward the Confessor and on the opposite side of her husband's grandparents, Edward I and Eleanor of Castile. Eight years later, Edward III died and was buried next to Philippa. By all accounts, their forty-year marriage had been happy.

The Queen's College, Oxford was founded by her chaplain Robert de Eglesfield in her honour.

Issue

Philippa and Edward had thirteen children, including five sons who lived into adulthood. Three of their children died of the Black Death in 1348. The rivalry of their numerous descendants would bring about the long-running and bloody dynastic wars known as the Wars of the Roses in the 15th century.

In popular culture
Philippa is a character in The Accursed Kings, a series of French historical novels by Maurice Druon. She was portrayed by Françoise Burgi in the 1972 French miniseries adaptation of the series, and by Marie de Villepin in the 2005 adaptation.

In 2003, she was voted as 5th on the list of 100 Great Black Britons. However, the decision to include her on the list has been criticised, with many historians noting that there was no evidence that suggested Philippa has any African ancestry.

Ancestry

Notes

References

Sources
Arnold, Margot. Queen Consorts of England: The Power Behind the Throne. New York: Facts On File, 1993.
  pages 185 & 186.
Salmonson, Jessica Amanda. (1991) The Encyclopedia of Amazons. Paragon House. page 212. 
Sury, Geoffroy G., Bayern Straubing Hennegau: la Maison de Bavière en Hainaut, XIVe – XVe s., (2nd Ed.), Geoffroy G. Sury, Edit., Brussels, 2010. pp. 55, 66 & 128.
 
 
  page 92.

See also

Counts of Hainaut family tree
Counts of Holland family tree

|-

1310 births
1369 deaths
14th-century English people
14th-century English women
14th-century viceregal rulers
14th-century women rulers
People from Valenciennes
English royal consorts
Duchesses of Aquitaine
Avesnes family
Regents of England
Ladies of the Garter
County of Hainaut
Burials at Westminster Abbey
Deaths from edema
English people of French descent
English people of Hungarian descent
English people of Spanish descent
English people of Italian descent
English people of Dutch descent
Women in medieval European warfare
Women in 14th-century warfare
Edward III of England